Héctor is a 2004 Spanish family drama film directed by Gracia Querejeta starring Nilo Mur as the title character and Adriana Ozores. The film won the Best Picture Award at the Málaga Film Festival and scooped four nominations to the 19th Goya Awards.

Plot 
Set in Madrid, the plot tracks the vicissitudes of the adaptation of a 16-year-old teenager (Héctor) to a new home and living with his aunt and uncle (Tere and Juan) in the wake of the death of her mother due to an accident, as well as coping with loss and the arrival of his father Martín (unacquainted with Héctor) from Mexico.

Cast

Production 
Produced by Elías Querejeta PC, DeAPlaneta and Ensueño Films, it had the participation of Canal+, Antena 3, TeleMadrid, Canal Sur, TVC, TVG, TVV, TV Canaria, Castilla-La Mancha Televisión. The film was shot in Madrid and its surroundings. Shooting wrapped by April 2003.

Release 
The film was presented at the Málaga Spanish Film Festival (FMCE) in April 2004. Distributed by Warner Sogefilms, Héctor was theatrically released in Spain on 7 May 2004.

Reception 
Jonathan Holland of Variety deemed the film to be "a wonderfully observed, intense family drama in which virtually every scene pulsates with warmth, compassion and intelligence".

Mirito Torreiro of Fotogramas rated the film with 3 out of 5 stars, praising the Querejeta's search for new territories while considering the "hieratic" register Mur was required to play as a negative point.

Accolades 

|-
| align = "center" rowspan = "2" | 2004 || rowspan = "2" | 7th Málaga Spanish Film Festival || colspan = "2" | Golden Biznaga for Best Film ||  || rowspan = "2" | 
|-
| Silver Biznaga for Best Actress || Adriana Ozores || 
|-
| align = "center" rowspan = "17" | 2005 || rowspan = "9" | 60th CEC Medals || colspan = "2" | Best Film ||  || rowspan = "9" | 
|-
| Best Director || Gracia Querejeta || 
|-
| Best Actress || Adriana Ozores || 
|-
| Best Supporting Actor || Pepo Oliva || 
|-
| Best Supporting Actress || Nuria Gago || 
|-
| Best Original Screenplay || David Planell, Gracia Querejeta || 
|-
| Best Editing || Nacho Ruiz Capillas || 
|-
| Best Music || Ángel Illarramendi || 
|-
| Best Newcomer || Nilo Mur || 
|-
| rowspan = "4" | 19th Goya Awards || Best Supporting Actor || Unax Ugalde ||  || rowspan = "4" | 
|-
| Best New Actress || Nuria Gago || 
|-
| Best New Actor || Nilo Mur || 
|-
| Best Original Score || Ángel Illarramendi || 
|-
| rowspan = "4" | 14th Actors and Actresses Union Awards || Best Film Actress in a Leading Role || Adriana Ozores ||  || rowspan = "4" | 
|-
| Best Film Actor in a Secondary Role || Unax Ugalde || 
|-
| Best New Actor || Nilo Mur || 
|-
| Best New Actress || Nuria Gago || 
|}

See also 
 List of Spanish films of 2004

References 

2000s Spanish-language films
Films shot in Madrid
Films set in Madrid
2004 drama films
Spanish drama films
2000s coming-of-age drama films
Spanish coming-of-age drama films
Films directed by Gracia Querejeta
Atresmedia Cine films
2000s Spanish films